Provincial Trunk Highway 34 (PTH 34) is a provincial primary highway located in the Canadian province of Manitoba. It runs from the U.S. border (where it meets with ND 20) to PTH 16 at the town of Gladstone.

PTH 34 is two lanes and runs north-south in the south-central region of the province. It is the main highway for the towns of Crystal City, Pilot Mound, and Holland. While the village of Austin is actually located 1 km east of the highway along PTH 1, the highway itself provides access to Austin's Agricultural Museum, which hosts the annual Thresherman's Reunion and Stampede each July.

The speed limit is 90 km/h (55 mph).

History
PTH 34 first appeared on the 1955 Manitoba Highway Map. When it was first added, the highway was a much shorter route between Gladstone and Holland, with the southern terminus located at PTH 2. The highway's southern terminus was extended to PTH 23 in 1957, and then to PTH 3 the following year.

The section between PTH 3 and the US border was originally designated as PTH 17. This southernmost portion was redesignated to PTH 34 in 1964.

When the highway was initially added, it was originally slated to end at PTH 3 in the south and PTH 4 (now PTH 16) in the north. As a result, the highway was designated as PTH 34 to reflect this configuration.

Major intersections

References

External links 
Official Name and Location - Declaration of Provincial Trunk Highways Regulation - The Highways and Transportation Act - Provincial Government of Manitoba
Official Highway Map - Published and maintained by the Department of Infrastructure - Provincial Government of Manitoba (see Legend and Map#2)
Google Maps Search - Provincial Trunk Highway 34

034